Yarkovsky (masculine), Yarkovskaya (feminine), or Yarkovskoye (neuter) may refer to:
Ivan Yarkovsky (1844–1902), Polish descent Russian civil engineer
35334 Yarkovsky, a main-belt asteroid named after him
Yarkovsky District, a district of Tyumen Oblast, Russia
Yarkovskaya, a rural locality (a village) in Yaroslavl Oblast, Russia